West Yellowstone News was a weekly newspaper in West Yellowstone, Montana, United States. The newspaper ceased publication in September 2016.

The paper was owned by Big Sky Publishing, which was a part of the Pioneer News Group. Publisher Stephanie Pressly said publicly that the closure was a financial decision driven by declining advertising revenue.

As of June 2018, the newspaper's web address forwarded users to the Bozeman Daily Chronicle, another paper owned by Big Sky Publishing.

References

External links

Newspapers published in Montana
Defunct weekly newspapers
News